Pharnacia or Pharnaceia or Pharnakeia, also known as Pharnacium or Pharnakion (Φαρνάκιον), was a town of ancient Phrygia.

Its site is unlocated.

References

Populated places in Phrygia
Former populated places in Turkey
Lost ancient cities and towns